This is a list of Antarctic and sub-Antarctic islands.

 Antarctic islands are, in the strict sense, the islands around Antarctica, situated on the Antarctic Plate, and south of the Antarctic Convergence. According to the terms of the Antarctic Treaty, claims to sovereignty over lands south of 60° S are not asserted.
 Sub-Antarctic islands are the islands situated closer to another continental mainland or on another tectonic plate, but are biogeographically linked to the Antarctic or being part of the Antarctic realm, roughly north of and adjacent to the Antarctic Convergence.

List of sub-Antarctic islands

A
 Antipodes Islands (New Zealand)
 Antipodes Island (New Zealand)
 Bollons Island (New Zealand)
 Auckland Islands (New Zealand)
 Adams Island, New Zealand
 Adams Rocks, New Zealand
 Amherst Rock
 Archer Rock
 Auckland Island
 Beacon Rock
 Beehive Rock
 Blanche Rock
 Chapel Rock
 Column Rocks
 Compadre Rock
 Davis Island
 Disappointment Island
 Dundas Island
 Enderby Island
 Ewing Island
 Fabulous Island
 Figure of Eight I
 Five Sisters Rock
 Frenchs Island
 Friday Island
 Green Island
 Invercauld Rock
 Lantern Rocks
 Masked Island
 Monumental Island
 Ocean Island
 Pillar Rock
 Pinnacle Rocks
 Rose Island
 Shag Rock
 Shoe Island
 Sugar Loaf Rocks
 Yule Island

B
 Bounty Islands (New Zealand)

C
 Campbell Islands (New Zealand)
 Campbell Island
 Dent Island
 Folly Island or Folly Islands
 Jacquemart Island
 Crozet Islands ( or officially Archipel Crozet) (France)
 L'Occidental (Western Group)
 Île aux Cochons (Pig Island)
 Two major rocks
 Brisants de l'Héroïne (Heroine Breakers)
 Rochers de la Meurthe (Meurthe Rocks)
 Île des Pingouins (Penguin Island)
 Brisant du Tamaris
 la Chandelle
 les Chaudrons de l'Enfer (maybe not an island, but a coastal section)
 Île Riou
 le Kiosque
 Rocher de l'Arche
 Îlots des Apôtres (Apostle Islets)
 le Caillou
 le Clown
 le Donjon
 l'Enclume
 la Grande Aiguille
 Grand Île (the biggest island of the Îlots des Apôtres)
 le Hangar
 les Jumeaux
 l'Obélisque
 Rocher Percé
 la Petite Aiguille
 Petite Île (the second-biggest island of the Îlots des Apôtres)
 Rocher Fendu
 Rocher Nord (the third-biggest island of the Îlots des Apôtres)
 Rocher Sud
 les Sentinelles du Diable
 la Sentinelle Perdue
 le Torpilleur
 L'Oriental (Eastern Group)
 Île de la Possession (Possession Island)
 Roche Carrée
 Roche Debout
 Rochers des Moines
 Roche Percée
 Rocher Pyramidal
 Rochers de la "Fortune"
 Île de l'Est (East Island)
 la Voile (small rock south of Île de l'Est)

D
 Diego Ramírez Islands (Chile)
 Águila Islet
 Isla Bartolomé
 Isla Gonzalo

I
 Ildefonso Islands (Chile)
 Amsterdam Island (France) 
 Saint Paul Island (France)

M
 Macquarie Island (Australia)
 Bishop and Clerk Islets
 Judge and Clerk Islets

P
 Prince Edward Islands (South Africa)
 Marion Island
 Prince Edward Island

S
 Snares Islands (New Zealand)

T
 Tierra del Fuego (Chile and Argentina Boundary treaty of 1881)

List of Antarctic islands north of 60° S

 Bouvet Island (Bouvetøya) (Norway)
 Heard Island and McDonald Islands (HIMI) (Australia)
 Heard Island
 McDonald Islands
 Kerguelen Islands (France)
 Île Foch 
 Île Howe
 Île Saint-Lanne Gramont
 Île du Port 
 Île Longue
 Île Haute
 Île Australia
 Île de l'Ouest 
 Îles du Prince-de-Monaco 
 Îles Nuageuses 
 Îles de Boynes 
 Îles Leygues
 Île Altazin
 Île Gaby
 South Georgia and the South Sandwich Islands (United Kingdom; claimed by Argentina)
 South Georgia Group
 The main island (South Georgia Island) and its adjacent islands
 South Georgia Island, the main island (variant names: Isla San Pedro, Sør-Georgia, Sydgeorgien, Süd-Georgien; historically Roché Island, Isle of Georgia)
 Brain Island 
 Bird Island
 Annenkov Island
 Coal Island
 Cooper Island
 Pickersgill Islands
 Saddle Island
 Welcome Islands
 Willis Islands
 Trinity Island
 Black Rocks
 The Shag Rocks and the Black Rock
 Shag Rocks 185 km west-northwest of South Georgia Island
 Black Rock 169 km west-northwest of South Georgia Island and 16 km southeast of the Shag Rocks
 Clerke Rocks 56 km east-southeast of South Georgia Island
 Vestfold Island
 Vincent Islands
 South Sandwich Islands
 Bristol Island
 Brothers Rocks
 Montagu Island
 Saunders Island
 Southern Thule
 Bellingshausen Island
 Cook Island
 Thule Island
 Traversay and Candlemas Islands
 Traversay Islands
 Leskov Island
 Visokoi Island
 Zavodovski Island
 Candlemas Islands
 Candlemas Island
 Boot Rock
 Vindication Island
 Buddha Rock 

List of largest Antarctic islands south of 60° S by area
This is a list of the 30 largest Antarctic islands south of 60° S by area.

List of Antarctic islands south of 60° S
All these islands fall under the terms of the Antarctic Treaty. The list is not complete.

A

 Aagaard Islands
 Abbott Island
 Abrupt Island
 Achernar Island
 Adams Island, Antarctica
 Adelaide Island or Isla Adelaida or Isla Belgrano - west side of the Antarctic Peninsula
 Afala Island
 Afuera Islands or Penguin Island or Dodge Rocks
 Aim Rocks
 Aitcho Islands
 Akin Island
 Akula Island
 Alabak Island
 Alamode Island
 Al'bov Rocks
 Alcheh Island
 Alcock Island
 Aldea Island
 Alectoria Island
 Alepu Rocks
 Alexander Island or Alexander I Island or Alexander I Land or Alexander Land or Alexander The First Island or Isla Alejandro I (claimed by Argentina, Chile, and the United Kingdom)
 Alfeus Island
 Alino Island
 Alpha Island
 Alka Island
 Alphard Island
 Amiot Islands
 Amsler Island
 Anchorage Island (Antarctica)
 Anchorage Island, Princess Elizabeth Land
 Andersen Island
 Andrée Island
 Andresen Island
 Angelov Island
 Antenna Island
 Anton Island
 Anvers Island or Antwerp Island or Antwerpen Island or Isla Amberes
 Apéndice Island
 Apollo Island
 Araguez Island
 Ardley Island
 Arrowsmith Island
 Aspis Island
 Aspland Island
 Asses Ears
 Astor Island
 Astrolabe Island
 Atherton Islands
 Atriceps Island
 Auster Islands
 Austin Rocks
 Austral Island 
 Austskjera
 Avian Island
 Avren Rocks
 Azimuth Islands
 Azuki Island

B

 Bablon Island
 Babushkin Island
 Backer Islands
 Baffle Rock
 Bager Island
 Bakewell Island
 Balaena Islands
 Balleny Islands
 Borradaile Island
 Buckle Island
 Sabrina Island
 Sturge Island
 Young Island
 Balsha Island
 Bandy Island
 Bar Island
 Barlow Island
 Barratt Island
 Barrett Island
 Barrientos Island
 Barrier Island
 Baseline Rock
 Basso Island
 Baurene Island
 Bayard Islands
 Bazett Island
 Beagle Island
 Beak Island
 Bear Island
 Bearing Island or Direction Island
 Beaufort Island
 Beaumont Island
 Beaumont Skerries
 Beaver Island
 Bedford Island
 Beer Island
 Bekas Rock
 Belchin Rock
 Belding Island
 Belogushev Island
 Benten Island
 Bennett Islands
 Berkley Island
 Berkner Island or Berkner Ice Rise or Hubley Island
 Bernal Islands
 Bernard Island
 Bertha Island
 Berthelot Islands
 Green Island (Berthelot Islands)
 Beslen Island
 Bielecki Island
 Biggs Island
 Bilyana Island
 Biscoe Islands
Adolph Islands
Barcroft Islands
Bates Island
Irving Island
Watkins Island
Metis Island
St. Christopher Island
Bona Mansio Island
St. Brigid Island
Todorova Island
St. Isidore Island
Chakarov Island
Renaud Island
Lavoisier Island
Krogh Island
Pickwick Island
 Bizeux Rock
 Bizone Rock
 Black Island
 Blaiklock Island
 Blair Islands
 Blake Island
 Blåskimen Island
 Bluff Island
 Boatin Island
 Bodloperka Island
 Bølingen Islands
 Boobyalla Islands
 Boogie Island
 Borceguí Island
 Boree Islands
 Borg Island
 Bowl Island
 Bowler Rocks
 Bowman Island
 Boxing Island
 Brabant Island
 Bradford Rock
 Bragg Islands
 Brash Island
 Bratina Island
 Breaker Island
 Breccia Island
 Bremen Island
 Breton Island
 Brewster Island
 Brian Island
 Bridgeman Island
 Brockhamp Islands
 Brødrene Rocks
 Broka Island
 Brooklyn Island
 Brosnahan Island
 Buchino Rocks
 Büdel Islands
 Buffer Island
 Buffon Islands
 Bugge Islands
 Bulnes Island
 Bunt Island
 Burke Island
 Burkett Islands
 Burnett Island
 Burtis Island
 Butler Island

C

 Cameron Island
 Canopus Islands
 Canopus Island
 Canopus Rocks
 Caraquet Rock
 Carlson Island
 Carney Island
 Carrel Island
 Carter Island
 Casabianca Island
 Case Island
 Castle Rock
 Casey Islands
 Casy Island
 Cave Island
 Cecilia Island
 Centre Island
 Chabrier Rock
 Challenger Island
 Chameau Island
 Chandler Island
 Chappel Island
 Chata Rock
 Charcot Island or Charcot Land
 Charlton Island
 Chatos Islands
 Chavez Island
 Cheesman Island
 Cherry Island
 Chërnyy Island
 Child Rocks
 Chiprovtsi Islets
 Christine Island
 Chukovezer Island
 Churicheni Island
 Claquebue Island
 Clarence Island
 Clark Island
 Cleft Island
 Clements Island
 Cliff Island
 Close Islands
 Clow Island
 Cobalescou Island
 Cockburn Island
 Compass Island
 Cono Island
 Consort Islands
 Conway Island
 Cormorant Island
 Cornet Island
 Cornish Islands
 Cornwall Island
 Corry Island
 Couling Island
 Coulman Island 
 Courtier Islands
 Covey Rocks
 Cowell Island
 Craggy Island
 Crohn Island
 Crouch Island
 Cruiser Rocks
 Cruzen Island
 Curie Island
 Curtis Island
 Curzon Islands
 Cuverville Island - west side of the Antarctic Peninsula

D

 Dailey Islands
 West Dailey Island
 Juergens Island
 Hatcher Island
 Uberuaga Island
 Kuechle Island
 Dales Island
 Dålk Island
 Danco Island or Isla Dedo - west side of the Antarctic Peninsula
 Danger Islands
 Daniel Island
 Darbel Islands
 Darboux Island
 Darwin Island
 Davidson Island
 Davis Island
 Davis Islands
 Day Island
 Dean Island 
 DeAtley Island
 Debenham Islands
 Ann Island
 Audrey Island
 Barbara Island
 Barry Island
 Debutante Island
 Decazes Island
 Deception Island
 Dee Island
 DeLaca Island
 Delaite Island
 Dellbridge Islands
 Big Razorback Island
 Inaccessible Island
 Little Razorback Island
 Tent Island
 Delta Island
 Demidov Island
 Dendtler Island
 Deniau Island
 Departure Rocks
 Depot Island
 Derby Island
 Descartes Island
 Desolation Island
 Detaille Island
 Deverall Island
 Dewart Island
 D'Hainaut Island
 Diamonen Island
 Diaz Rock
 Dieglman Island
 Dinea Island
 Dink Island
 Dint Island
 Diomedea Island
 Dion Islands
 Direction Island or Bearing Island
 Dismal Island
 Dixson Island
 Dlagnya Rocks
 Dodd Island
 Dodman Island
 Dolleman Island
 Donovan Islands
Chappel Island
Glasgal Island
Grinnell Island
Lilienthal Island
 Dorsey Island
 Douanier Rock
 Double Islands
 Douglas Islands
 Doumer Island
 Dream Island
 Driscoll Island
 Dru Rock
 Drygalski Island
 DuBois Island
 Duchaylard Island
 Dumbbell Island
 Dumoulin Islands
 Dunbar Islands
 Dundee Island - off tip of the Antarctic Peninsula
 Duroch Islands
 Cohen Islands
 Gándara Island
 Kopaitic Island
 Largo Island
 Link Island
 Ortiz Island
 Pebbly Mudstone Island
 Ponce Island
 Wisconsin Islands
 Dustin Island 
 Dyer Island
 Dyment Island
 Dynamite Island

E

 Eadie Island
 Eagle Island
 Earle Island
 Early Islands
 Eddystone Rocks
 Edisto Rocks
 Edman Island
 Edwards Islands
 Egg Island
 Eichorst Island
 Einstøding Islands
 Einstødingen Island
 Elephant Rocks
 Elisabethinsel
 Embassy Islands
 Emeline Island
 Emen Island
 Emma Island
 Empereur Island
 Emperor Island
 Endresen Islands
 Enterprise Island or Isla Lientur or Isla Nansen Norte or North Nansen Island
 Esperanto Island
 Esplin Islands
 Eta Island
 Etna Island
 Ewing Island
 Express Island

F

 Farrington Island
 Farwell Island 
 Feniks Island
 Field Rock
 Filla Island
 Fish Islands
 Flounder Island
 Mackerel Island
 The Minnows
 Salmon Island
 Trout Island
 Fisher Island
 Fitzroy Island
 Fizalia Island
 Fizkin Island
 Flat Islands
 Béchervaise Island
 East Budd Island
 Evans Island
 Stinear Island
 West Budd Island
 Flatvaer Islands
 East Ongul Island
 Ongul Island
 Flein Island
 Fleurus Island
 Florence Island
 Fletcher Islands
 Fletcher Island
 Flutter Island
 Flyspot Rocks
 Fold Island
 Folger Rock
 Foote Islands
 Foreland Island
 Forrester Island 
 Fourier Island
 Fowler Islands
 Fram Islands
 Francis Island
 Franklin Island 
 Frazier Islands
Charlton Island
Dewart Island
Nelly Island
 Fregata Island
 Friedburginsel
 Fuente Rock
 Fuller Island
 Fuller Rock

G

 Galiche Rock
 Galten Islands
 Garde Islands
 Garnet Rocks
 Gaston Islands
 Geologists Island
 Gibbney Island
 Gibbous Rocks
 Gibbs Island
 Giganteus Island
 Gillock Island 
 Girdler Island
 Ginger Islands
 Glarus Island
 Glasgal Island
 Glinka Islands
 Glumche Island
 Gnome Island
 Gnomon Island
 Gränicher Island
 Graovo Rocks
 Gremlin Island
 Grod Island
 Goetschy Island
 González Island
 Goritsa Rocks
 Gourdin Island
 Gouverneur Island
 Grace Rock
 Grant Island
 Greben' Island
 Grinnell Island
 Groves Island
 Guardian Rock
 Guano Island
 Guébriant Islands
 Guesalaga Island
 Guile Island
 Guyer Rock
 Guyou Islands

H

 Håkollen Island
 Hailstorm Island
 Half Moon Island
 Halfway Island
 Hanka Island
 Hannam Islands
 Hansen Island
 Hansen Rocks
 Haralambiev Island
 Harrop Island
 Harry Island
 Harvey Islands
 Haswell Islands
 Haswell Island
 Hatch Islands
 Havstein Island
 Hawker Island
 Hayrick Island
 Head Island
 Heap Island
 Hearst Island
 Heckmann Island
 Hedgehog Island
 Heftye Island
 Hélène Island
 Henderson Island
 Henfield Rock
 Henkes Islands
 Hennessy Islands
 Henry Islands
 Hermit Island
 Heroína Island
 Hervé Island
 Heywood Island
 Hiyoko Island
 Hjart Island
 Hoatsin Island
 Hobbs Islands
 Hobby Rocks
 Hodgeman Islands
 Hogg Islands
 Holmes Island
 Holmes Rock
 Honkala Island
 Honores Rock
 Hoodwink Island
 Hop Island
 Horseshoe Island
 Horvath Island
 Hoseason Island 
 Houle Island
 Hovde Island
 Hugo Island 
 Hum Island
 Humble Island
 Hump Island
 Hydrographer Islands
 McIntyre Island (Hydrographer Islands)

I
 Ibar Rocks
 Ifo Island
 Imelin Island
 Inaccessible Island
 Indrehovdeholmen
 Inexpressible Island
 Islay Island

J

 Jacobs Island
 Jagar Islands
 Jagged Island (Graham Land)
 Jagged Island (South Shetland Islands)
 James Ross Island group
 James Ross Island
 Janus Island
 Jaynes Islands
 Jenny Island
 Jester Rock
 Jigsaw Islands
 Jingle Island
 Jinks Island
 Jocelyn Islands
 Lee Island
 Petersen Island
 Verner Island
 Johansen Islands
 Johnson Island (Antarctica)- within the Abbot Ice Shelf about 14 nautical miles (26 km) SE of Dustin Island
 Joinville Island group
 Joinville Island - off tip of the Antarctic Peninsula
 D'Urville Island - off tip of the Antarctic Peninsula
 Jona Island
 Jorge Island
 Joubert Rock
 June Island
 Jurien Island

K

 Kabile Island
 Kalmar Island
 Kalotina Island
 Kame Island
 Kamelen Island
 Kamera Island
 Kaname Island
 Kaprela Island
 Karelin Islands
 Karm Island
 Kartografov Island
 Keel Island
 Keep Rock
 Kellas Islands
 Kellick Island
 Kereka Island
 Kevin Islands
 Keyhole Island
 Khmara Island
 Kidd Islands
 Kidson Island
 Kilby Island
 Kilifarevo Island
 Killingbeck Island
 Kirkwood Islands
 Kirsty Island
 Kirton Island
 Kista Rock
 Kitney Island
 Kizer Island
 Klakkane Islands
 Klamer Island
 Klung Islands
 Klung Island
 Knezha Island
 Knight Rocks
 Kondor Island
 Kril Island
 Kring Islands
 Krok Island
 Kroshka Island
 Koala Island
 Koechlin Island
 Koll Rock
 Kolven Island
 Komuniga Island
 Kondor Island
 Kormoran Island
 Kosatka Island
 Koshava Island
 Kostenurka Island
 Kostilka Island
 Kostov Island
 Kovach Island
 Krivus Island
 Krok Island
 Kroshka Island
 Kurumi Island

L

 La Conchée
 Lacuna Island
 Lafarge Rocks
 Laggard Island
 Lagoon Island
 Lagotellerie Island
 Lagrange Island
 Lahille Island
 Lake Island
 Laktionov Island
 Lamantin Island
 Lamarck Island
 Lambda Island
 Lamya Island
 Landrum Island
 Lang Island
 Langhofer Island
 Lapa Island
 Laplace Island
 Lapteva Island
 Larrouy Island
 Laseron Islands
 Lauff Island 
 Låvebrua Island
 Law Islands
 Latady Island
 Lecointe Island
 Leeve Island
 Leningradskiy Island
 Léonie Island
 Léonie Islands
 Leppe Island
 Lesidren Island
 Leskov Island
 Levy Island
 Lewis Island
 Liard Island
 Liberty Rocks
 Lichen Island
 Liège Island
 Lientur Rocks
 Lilienthal Island
 Limitrophe Island
 Limoza Island
 Limpet Island
 Lindenberg Island
 Lion Island
 Lippmann Islands
 Lipps Island
 Litchfield Island
 Livingston Island
 Llanquihue Islands
Dog Island
 Lobodon Island
 Lodge Rock
 Long Island
 Long Rock
 Louise Island
 Low Rock
 Lucas Island
 Lugg Island
 Luna Island
 Lurker Rock
 Lyutibrod Rocks

M

 Mackellar Islands
 Greater Mackellar Island
 Lesser Mackellar Island
 Macklin Island
 Maglizh Rocks
 Magnetic Island
 Maher Island 
 Makresh Rocks
 Malus Island
 Mame Island
 Manchot Island
 Mane Skerry
 Manning Island
 Manoury Island
 Marégraphe Island
 Marguerite Island
 Marie Island
 Mariholm
 Mariner Islands
 Marshall Archipelago
 Benton Island 
 Cronenwett Island 
 Grinder Island 
 Hannah Island 
 Hutchinson Island
 Kramer Island 
 Madden Island 
 Orr Island 
 Przybyszewski Island 
 Thode Island 
 Martin Island
 Martin Islands
 Masson Island or Mission Island
 Masteyra Island
 McCallie Rocks
 McCarthy Island
 McConnel Islands
 McKinnon Island
 McKinzie Islands
 McMahon Islands
 McMullin Island
 McNamara Island
 Meade Islands
 Meduza Island
 Megaw Island
 Meholmen Island
 Melanita Island
 Melchior Islands
 Alpha Island
 Bremen Island
 Delta Island
 Eta Island
 Lambda Island
 Pabellon Island
 Pi Islands
 Psi Islands
 Omega Island
 Sigma Islands
 Tripod Island
 Meldia Rock
 Mellona Rocks
 Melyane Island
 Mendori Island
 Ménier Island
 Merger Island
 Mica Islands
 Mickle Island
 Mida Island
 Midas Island
 Mikhaylov Island
 Mikkelsen Islands
 Miladinovi Islets
 Miles Island
 Milev Rocks
 Mill Island
 Millerand Island
 Milnes Island
 Minamo Island
 Mirage Island
 Mite Skerry
 Mitsudomoe Islands
 Molecule Island
 Molholm Island
 Monge Island
 Moody Island 
 Morency Island
 Morris Island 
 Morris Rock
 Moss Islands
 Mousinho Island
 Moureaux Islands
 Moyes Islands
 Mügge Island
 Mule Island
 Mulga Island 
 Mulroy Island
 Mumm Islands
 Murphy Rocks
 Murray Island
 Mushroom Island
 Myall Islands

N

 Nabbøya
 Nadezhdy Island
 Nakaya Islands
 Nansen Island or Isla Nansen Sur
 Napier Island
 Nelly Island
 Nelson Rock
 Neny Island or Neny Islands
 Nesholmen Island
 Nestorov Island
 Nesøya
 New Rock
 Newman Island
 Newton Island
 The Niblets
 Nikudin Rock
 Niznik Island
 Nøkkel Island
 Nøkkelholmane Islands
 Nolan Island 
 Nord Island
 North Nansen Island or Enterprise Island or Isla Lientur or Isla Nansen Norte
 Nøst Island
 Novyy Island
 Numbat Island
 Nunn Island 
 Nupkins Island
 Nusser Island

O

 O'Brien Island
 Oescus Island
 Ofelia Island
 Ohlin Island or Bailys Island
 Okol Rocks
 Oldham Island
 Oldroyd Island
 Oliver Island
 Olson Island
 Omega Island
 Omicron Islands
 Ommundsen Island
 Ondori Island
 Ongley Island
 Ongulgalten Island
 Ongulkalven Island
 Onogur Islands
 Oom Island
 Opaka Rocks
 Orne Islands
 Orsoya Rocks
 Osenovlag Island
 Osøya
 Ouellette Island
 Outcast Islands
 Owen Island
 Owston Islands
 Oyako Islands
 Oyayubi Island
 Øygarden Group

P

 Padda Island
 Palmer Archipelago
 Padpadak Island
 Abbott Island
 Anvers Island
 Auguste Island
 Bills Island
 Brabant Island
 Casabianca Island
 Cobalcescou Island
 Cormorant Island
 Davis Island
 Doumer Island
 Dream Island
 Fournier Island
 Halfway Island
 Hermit Island
 Humble Island
 Janus Island
 Joubin Islands
 Laggard Island
 Lecointe Island
 Liège Island
 Litchfield Island
 Melchior Islands
 Alpha Island
 Bremen Island
 Delta Island
 Eta Island
 Lambda Island
 Pabellon Island
 Psi Islands
 Omega Island
 Sigma Islands
 Tripod Island
 Ohlin Island
 Outcast Islands
 Spert Island
 Torgersen Island
 Tower Island
 Two Hummock Island
 Wiencke Island
 Yoke Island
 Zigzag Island
 Palosuo Islands
 Papazov Island
 Parallactic Islands
 Parallactic Island
 Partizan Island
 Pasarel Island
 Pascal Island
 Pasteur Island
 Pate Island
 Patella Island
 Paterson Islands
 Patresh Rock
 Patricia Islands
 Paul Islands
 Paulet Island - tiny island southeast of Dundee Island
 Pauling Islands
 Peage Island
 Peake-Jones Rock
 Pegas Island
 Peine Island
 Pelikan Island
 Pelseneer Island
 Penola Island
 Peperuda Island
 Perch Island
 Perivol Rock
 Peter I Island (claimed by Norway)
 Petermann Island
 Petrel Island
 Petrelik Island
 Petty Rocks
 Pfaff Island
 Phanagoria Island
 Phelps Island
 Phils Island
 Phoque Island
 Pig Rock
 Pigmy Rock
 Pila Island
 Piñero Island
 Pingvin Island
 Pinn Island
 Pinnacle Rock
 Pipkin Rock
 Pisanitsa Island
 Piton Island
 Pitt Islands
 Plaice Island
 Plog Island
 Pod Rocks
 Pogledets Island
 Polich Island
 Pollholmen
 Ponton Island
 Pordim Islands
 Possession Islands
 Possession Island
 Postillion Rock
 Potmess Rocks
 Pourquoi Pas Island
 Powder Island
 Pranke Island 
 Presnakov Island
 Preston Island
 Priboy Rocks
 Prisad Island
 Proclamation Island
 Prosechen Island
 Puffball Islands
 Pullen Island
 Pup Rock
 Puzzle Islands
 Pyramid Island
 Pyrites Island
 Pyrox Island
 Pythia Island

Q
 Query Island
 Quilp Rock

R

 Rabisha Rocks
 Rabot Island
 Racovitza Islands
 Radford Island
 Rak Island
 Raklitsa Island
 Ralida Island
 Rambler Island
 Ramírez Island
 Randall Rocks
 Ranvik Island
 Rasmussen Island
 Rauer Islands
 Ravn Rock
 Red Island
 Redfearn Island
 Redina Island
 Reference Islands
 Refuge Islands
 Reluctant Island
 Renard Island
 Rescape Islands
 Ressac Island
 Retour Island
 Revolver Island
 Revsnes Island
 Rho Islands
 Rhyolite Islands
 Ribnik Island
 Riddle Islands
 Ridge Island
 Ridley Island
 Rigel Skerries
 Rigsby Islands
 Riksa Islands
 Ring Rock
 Robertson Island
 Robertson Islands
 Rocca Islands
 Rog Island
 Rogozen Island
 Rogulyat Island
 Rollet Island
 Romeo Island
 Rongé Island
 Rookery Islands
 Roosevelt Island (inside of Ross Sea) (claimed by New Zealand)
 Ross Archipelago
 Beaufort Island
 Black Island
 Dellbridge Islands
 Inaccessible Island
 Tent Island
 Ross Island (inside of Ross Sea) (claimed by New Zealand)
 White Island
 Rostand Island
 Rotalia Island
 Rothschild Island 
 Rouse Islands
 Roux Island
 Row Island
 Rowett Island
 Rugged Island
 Rumpa Island
 Runaway Island
 Rusokastro Rock
 Ryrie Rock

S

 Safety Island
 Saffery Islands
 Sagita Island
 Sail Rock
 San Telmo Island
 Sanavirón Island
 Sanctuary Islands
 Sansom Islands
 Sawert Rocks
 Sawyer Island
 Schaefer Islands
 Scholander Island
 Schule Island
 Scott Island (claimed by New Zealand)
 Seal Islands
 Seal Island
 Seymour Island
 Shaula Island
 Shaw Islands
 Sheehan Islands
 Sheelagh Islands
 Shepard Island
 Sherman Island
 Shirley Island
 Short Island
 Shortcut Island
 Shut Island
 Sierra Island
 Sif Island
 Sigaren Islands
 Sigma Islands
 Sillard Islands
 Simeonov Island
 Sims Island
 Single Island
 Siple Island
 Sirius Islands
 Skoba Island
 Skrino Rocks
 Slumkey Island
 Smiggers Island
 Smith Rocks
 Smyley Island
 Snodgrass Island
 Snow Hill Island)
 Snubbin Island
 Soatris Island
 Soldat Island
 Solitario Island
 Solstreif Island
 Sorge Island
 Sostrene Islands
 Sotomayor Island
 South Orkney Islands (claimed by Argentina/Chile/United Kingdom)
 Acuña Island
 Coronation Island
 Gosling Islands
 Larsen Islands
 Laurie Island )
 Inaccessible Islands
 Powell Island 
 Robertson Islands or Robertsons Islands
 Shagnasty Island
 Signy Island 
 South Shetland Islands (claimed by Argentina/Chile/United Kingdom)
 Bridgeman Island (minor)
 Clarence Island
 Cornwallis Island (minor)
 Deception Island
 Elephant Island
 Gibbs Island
 Greenwich Island
 Half Moon Island (minor)
 King George Island or Île du Roi Georges or Isla 25 de Mayo or Isla Rey George or Isla Veinticinco de Mayo or King George's Island or König Georg Insel or Waterloo Island (the largest of the South Shetland Islands)
 Livingston Island
 Low Island
 Nelson Island
 Penguin Island (minor - one of several "Penguin" Islands in the Antarctic region)
 Robert Island
 Rowett Island (minor)
 Rugged Island (minor - one of several so named in the Antarctic region)
 Seal Island
 Smith Island
 Snow Island
 Spaatz Island
 Spano Island
 Spatnik Island
 Spayd Island
 Spert Island
 Sphinx Island
 Split Rock
 Sprey Island
 Sprightly Island
 Spume Island
 Square End Island
 Stanley Island
 Stedet Island
 Stego Island
 Stein Islands
 Steinemann Island
 Stephen Island 
 Stepping Stones
 Sterna Island
 Sterrett Islands
 Stevens Rock
 Stevenson Island
 Steventon Island 
 Steele Island
 Steinemann Island
 Stillwell Island
 Stipple Rocks
 Stoker Island)
 Stoltz Island
 Stonington Island
 Suchland Islands
 Sugarloaf Island
 Suhache Rock
 Surge Rocks
 Suter Island
 Svenner Islands
 Svetulka Island
 Svip Rocks
 Swain Group
 Berkley Island
 Bradford Rock
 Burnett Island
 Cameron Island
 Daniel Island
 Hailstorm Island
 Honkala Island
 Wonsey Rock
 Wyche Island
 Symington Islands
 Systerflesene Group

T

 Table Island
 Tadpole Island
 Tail Island
 Tambra Island
 Taralezh Island
 Tartar Island
 Tatul Island
 Tau Islands
 Taylor Islands
 Te Islands
 Teall Island
 Teigan Island
 Teksla Island
 Temenuga Island
 Tenorio Rock
 Tent Island
 Terra Firma Islands
 Tetrad Islands
 Teyssier Island
 Thala Island
 The Pointers
 Thiebault Island
 Thil Island
 Thomas Island
 Thompson Island
 Thomsen Islands
 Thor Island
 Thorfinn Islands
 Thorgaut Island
 Thurston Island
 Tiber Rocks
 Tigan Island
 Tillett Islands
 Tirizis Island
 Tokarev Island
 Toledo Island
 Tonagh Island
 Tongue Rock
 Tongue Rocks
 Tonkin Island
 Topografov Island
 Torckler Rocks
 Torgersen Island
 Tot Island
 Tower Island
 Transverse Island
 Trebishte Island
 Treklyano Island
 Trepassey Island
 Trevillian Island
 Triad Islands
 Trice Islands
 Trigonia Island
 Trigwell Island
 Trilling Islands
 Trinity Island
 Triple Islands
 Tripod Island
 Tristan Island
 Trivelpiece Island
 Trivial Islands
 Trowbridge Island
 Trump Islands
 Trundle Island
 Trundy Island
 Tryne Islands
 Tsankov Island
 Tsiolkovskiy Island
 Tukey Island
 Tupinier Islands
 Tupman Island
 Turnabout Island
 Turner Island
 Tvarditsa Rocks
 Twig Rock
 Two Hummock Island
 Two Summit Island
 Tyulen Island

U
 Ufs Island
 Umber Island
 Ungane Islands
 Unneruskollen Island
 Upper Island
 Useful Island
 Utholmen Island

V

 Vagrant Island
 Valchedram Island
 Van Rocks
 Van Hulssen Islands
 Van Hulssen Island
 Vardim Rocks
 Vaugondy Island
 Vega Island
 Verblyud Island
 Verte Island
 Vetrilo Rocks
 Vicars Island
 Vidal Rock
 Vieugué Island
 Vilare Island
 Vize Islands
 Vkhodnoy Island
 Vollmer Island
 Voluyak Rocks
 Vortex Island
 Vromos Island

W

 Waite Islands
 Wakadori Island
 Waratah Islands
 Ward Islands
 Warnock Islands
 Warren Island
 Warriner Island
 Wattle Island
 Webb Island
 Webber Island
 Weertman Island
 Welch Island
 Welch Rocks
 Weller Island
 White Island (Enderby Land)
 White Island (Ross Archipelago)
 White Islands
 Wiencke Island
 Wigg Islands
 Wilhelm Archipelago
 Anagram Islands
 Argentine Islands
 Channel Rock
 Barbière Island
 The Barchans
 Bazzano Island
 Betbeder Islands
 Black Island (Wilhelm Archipelago)
 Booth Island
 Boudet Island
 Bradley Rock
 Brown Island
 The Buttons
 Charlat Island
 Cholet Island
 Cruls Islands
 Dannebrog Islands
 Detour Island
 Fanfare Island
 Final Island
 Flank Island
 Forge Islands
 Friar Island
 Galindez Island
 Grotto Island
 Guido Island
 Host Island
 Hovgaard Island
 Indicator Island
 Irizar Island
 Knight Island
 Leopard Island
 Lisboa Island
 Lobel Island
 Locator Island
 Manciple Island
 Maranga Island
 Mazzeo Island
 Myriad Islands
 Nob Island
 Pléneau Island
 Prevot Island
 Prioress Island
 Quintana Island
 Rallier Island
 Reeve Island
 Roca Islands
 Shelter Islands
 Sinclair Island
 Skua Island
 Smooth Island
 Sögen Island
 Somerville Island
 Splitwind Island 
 Squire Island
 Stray Islands
 Thiébault Island
 Three Little Pigs
 Uruguay Island
 Vedel Islands
 Wauwermans Islands
 Wednesday Island
 Winter Island
 Williams Rocks
 Wiltshire Rocks
 Windmill Islands
 Allison Islands
 Ardery Island
 Austral Island
 Bailey Rocks
 Beall Island
 Birkenhauer Island
 Boffa Island
 Borrello Island
 Bosner Island
 Bousquet Island
 Boving Island
 Cloyd Island
 Cronk Islands
 Denison Island
 Fitzpatrick Rock
 Ford Island
 Gibney Reef
 Griffith Island
 Hemphill Island
 Herring Island
 Holl Island
 Hollin Island
 Kilby Island
 McIntyre Island
 Odbert Island
 Peterson Island
 Pidgeon Island
 Sack Island
 Shirley Island
 Smith Islands
 Window Island
 Winkle Island
 Withem Island
 Wittmann Island
 Wollan Island
 Wollesen Islands
 Wombat Island
 Wonsey Rock
 Wood Island
 Woogie Island
 Woolpack Island
 Wright Island 
 Wyatt Island
 Wyatt Earp Islands
 Wyche Island
 Wyck Island

Y
 Yalour Islands
 Yastreb Island
 Yato Rocks
 Yoke Island
 Yordanov Island
 Yseult Island
 Ytrehovdeholmen Island

Z
 Zavadovskiy Island
 Zavala Island
 Zebil Island
 Zed Islands
 Zherav Island
 Zigzag Island
 Zikoniya Island
 Zukriegel Island
 Zverino Island

Sub-lists
 New Zealand Subantarctic Islands

See also

 Antarctic
 Falkland Islands
 Lists of islands
 List of islands in the Arctic Ocean
 List of islands in the Atlantic Ocean
 List of islands in the Indian Ocean
 List of islands in the Pacific Ocean
 Subantarctic

References

External links

 U.S. Geological Survey, Atlas of Antarctic Research

 
 
Islands
Antarctic and subantarctic
Lists of islands by ocean